Blossfeldia is a genus of cactus (family Cactaceae) containing only one species, Blossfeldia liliputiana, native to South America in northwestern Argentina (Jujuy, Salta, Tucumán, Catamarca and Mendoza Provinces) and southern Bolivia (Santa Cruz and Potosí Departments). It grows at 1,200–3,500 m altitude in the Andes, typically growing in rock crevices, and often close to waterfalls.

It is of note as the smallest cactus species in the world, with a mature size of around 10–12 mm diameter. The flowers are white or rarely pink, 6–15 mm long and 5–7 mm diameter.

The genus Blossfeldia has been divided into many separate species; however most morphological evidence supports that the genus is monotypic, and contains only Blossfeldia liliputiana.

The species is named after the fictional country of Lilliput, where all of the inhabitants are minute.

Taxonomy
The genus and species were first described in 1937 by Erich Werdermann after being discovered in northern Argentina by Harry Blossfeld and Oreste Marsoner. The genus name honours Blossfeld. Blossfeldia liliputiana has several features making it unique among cacti, including a very small number of stomata, the absence of a thickened cuticle, and hairy seeds with an aril. It is placed in the subfamily Cactoideae, and traditionally in the tribe Notocacteae. However, molecular phylogenetic studies have repeatedly shown that it is sister to the remaining members of the subfamily, and well removed from other genera placed in the Notocacteae:

Recognizing the position of Blossfeldia, Nyffeler and Eggli, in their 2010 classification of Cactaceae, placed it in a separate tribe, Blossfeldieae, within Cactoideae. Earlier, Blossfeldia was considered as a distinct genus within the tribe Notocacteae; it had even been placed in an entirely separate subfamily, Blossfeldioideae.

References

Bibliography
 Buxbaum F., "Gattung Blossfeldia", in Krainz H., Die Kakteen, 1.11.1964
 Fechser H., "Blossfeldia liliputana - The Tiniest Cactus", Cact. Succ. J. (US), 32 : 123-125, 1960
 John V., "Strombocactus, Blossfeldia a Aztekium", Kaktusy, 23 : 38-41, 1987
 Kilian G., "Beitrag zur Blossfeldia-Kultur", Kakt. und and. Succ., 13 : 82-83, 1962
 Köhler U., "Beobachtungen an Blossfeldien", Kakt. und and. Succ., 17 : 11-14, 1966; 
 "Blossfeldia heute", Kakt. und and. Sukk., 32 : 132133, 1981
 Říha J., "Blossfeldia liliputana Werdermann, Kaktusy, 22 : 105-107, 1986
 

http://llifle.com/Encyclopedia/CACTI/Family/Cactaceae/5701/Blossfeldia_liliputana

External links
Mauseth cacti research: Blossfeldia liliputana
Cacti Guide: Blossfeldia liliputana
Blossfeldia liliputana habitat pictures

Cactoideae
Monotypic Cactaceae genera
Cacti of South America